Giovanni Greco (born 11 April 1990) is an Italian badminton player. He started playing badminton in 1999, in a small town near Palermo. He started competing competitively when he was 20, and was selected to join the national team in 2009. He participated at the 2013 and 2018 Mediterranean Games, also at the 2015 and 2019 European Games.

Achievements

BWF International Challenge/Series (6 titles, 3 runners-up) 
Men's doubles

  BWF International Challenge tournament
  BWF International Series tournament
  BWF Future Series tournament

References

External links 
 

1990 births
Living people
Sportspeople from Palermo
Italian male badminton players
Badminton players at the 2015 European Games
Badminton players at the 2019 European Games
European Games competitors for Italy
Competitors at the 2013 Mediterranean Games
Competitors at the 2018 Mediterranean Games
Mediterranean Games competitors for Italy